Miodrag Jovanović may refer to:
 Miodrag Jovanović (footballer, born 1922), Serbian footballer
 Miodrag Jovanović (footballer, born 1977), Serbian footballer
 Miodrag Jovanović (footballer, born 1986), Serbian footballer
 Miodrag Jovanović (basketball) for KK Bor